Megan Campbell (born 28 June 1993) is an Irish professional footballer who plays as a centre back for Women's Super League club Liverpool FC and as a left back for the Republic of Ireland women's national team. She has previously played for St. Francis, Raheny United, Florida State Seminoles and Manchester City. In 2010, she was a member of the Republic of Ireland U-17 squad that were runners-up at the 2010 UEFA Women's Under-17 Championship and quarter-finalists at the 2010 FIFA U-17 Women's World Cup. Campbell is known as a long throw-in specialist and has been compared to Rory Delap.

Early life
Campbell was born in Drogheda, County Louth and is the daughter of Eamonn and Suzanne Campbell. She is a granddaughter of The Dubliners lead guitarist, Eamonn Campbell. She has three sisters – Jaymee, Dawn and Jade. She grew up on Drogheda's Scarlet Street and was educated at Our Lady's College, Greenhills and at the Institute of Technology, Carlow. She also played youth football with local Drogheda teams – Grove Rangers, Boyne Rovers and Moneymore.

Playing career

St Francis
In 2009, four weeks after turning 16, Campbell came on as a substitute for St Francis in the FAI Women's Cup final against St Catherine's. Her teammates included Grainne Kierans and Mary Waldron. Campbell also played for St Francis in the 2009–10 and 2010–11 UEFA Women's Champions League group stage tournaments.

Raheny United
In 2012–13 Campbell was a member of the Raheny United team that won an FAI Women's Cup and Women's National League double. In October 2012, Raheny United defeated Peamount United 2–1 in the FAI Women's Cup final at Dalymount Park before going on to win the WNL title. Campbell was subsequently named in the 2012–13 WNL Team of the Season. Campbell's teammates at Raheny United included Mary Waldron, Noelle Murray, Ciara Grant and Siobhán Killeen.

Florida State Seminoles
In 2013 Campbell began playing for Florida State Seminoles after obtaining a scholarship to Florida State University, where she majored in social science. In her first three seasons with Florida State she has played in at least 60 games, excluding friendlies, and was credited with 31 assists. Between 2013 and 2015 she helped Florida State win three consecutive ACC titles. In 2014 Campbell was named in the ACC All-Tournament Team and in the 2015 ACC final she scored in the penalty shoot-out against Virginia Cavaliers. In 2013 Florida State were also runners up in the NCAA Division I Women's Soccer Championship before going on to win the title in 2014. In 2015 Campbell acted as a recruiter for Florida State when she approached fellow Republic of Ireland women's youth international, Megan Connolly, about playing for the Seminoles.

Campbell had been described as a senior in Florida State Seminoles' 2014 title-winning season and had been expected to feature in the 2015 NWSL College Draft. But it was discovered she had another year of college eligibility remaining and wished to use that instead. After completing her college career, Campbell was also "noticeably absent" from the 2016 NWSL College Draft.

Manchester City

In February 2016 Campbell became Manchester City's fourth signing of the off-season, announcing that she had signed a professional contract with the English UEFA Women's Champions League contenders. She won a domestic treble with the club, then signed a contract extension in June 2017. Campbell had played particularly well in the 2017 FA Women's Cup Final, serving two assists as Manchester City beat Birmingham City 4–1 at Wembley Stadium.

She suffered an anterior cruciate ligament injury in November 2017 during a UEFA Women's Champions League match against LSK Kvinner FK and was ruled out for several months. In June 2020 she signed a new one-year contract with Manchester City while recovering from another long-term injury, this time to tendons in her foot.

Liverpool
In June 2021, Women's Championship club Liverpool signed Campbell, after her five-year spell at Manchester City. She overcame some injury-related absence in the first part of the 2021–22 season to become an important member of the title-winning Liverpool team who won promotion back to the Women's Super League. She signed a new contract with Liverpool in June 2022.

International career

Youth

Campbell has represented the Republic of Ireland at U-17, U-19 and senior level. In 2010 she was a member of the Republic of Ireland U-17 squad that were runners-up in the 2010 UEFA Women's Under-17 Championship and quarter-finalists in the 2010 FIFA U-17 Women's World Cup. In the UEFA championship, Campbell scored twice: the winner in 2–1 group victory against Sweden and  the semi-final goal in the 1–0 win over Germany. In the World Cup, Campbell scored the opening goal in a 3–0 win against Ghana.

Senior

Campbell played for a senior Republic of Ireland team of home-based players in a behind closed doors match against Northern Ireland. She then won her first official cap in a friendly against Switzerland at Richmond Park in August 2011. Campbell came on as substitute for Louise Quinn after 62 minutes during the 1–0 defeat by the Swiss. On 5 April 2014 in a 2015 FIFA Women's World Cup qualifier against Germany at Tallaght Stadium, Campbell provided two assists with throw-ins. Despite Campbell's effort the Republic of Ireland lost 3–2.

After a two-year absence due to injuries, Campbell was called up to the senior Republic of Ireland squad again in February 2022, for the 2022 Pinatar Cup in Murcia. On 1 September 2022 Campbell started her first competitive national team match for three years in Ireland's play-off-securing 1–0 2023 FIFA Women's World Cup qualification – UEFA Group A win over Finland at Tallaght Stadium.

International goals
Scores and results list Republic of Ireland's goal tally first.

Playing style
According to her Liverpool manager Matt Beard, Campbell is an adaptable left-sided defensive player: "Meg offers a bit of versatility as she can play centre-back or left-back". Throughout her career she has been renowned as a long throw-in specialist: "Fortunately, my arms are quite hyper-mobile and can go further back than the average person". In 2020 Campbell declared that she wanted to be known for more than her exceptionally long throw-ins and persistent injuries.

Honours

Individual
 2012–13 WNL Team of the Season 
  2014 ACC All-Tournament Team

Team
Manchester City
FA Women's Cup: 2019-20

St Francis
FAI Women's Cup
Winner:  2009
Raheny United
Women's National League
Winner: 2012–13
FAI Women's Cup
Winner:  2012
Florida State Seminoles
NCAA Division I Women's Soccer Championship
Winner: 2014
Runner Up: 2013
ACC Women's Soccer Tournament
Winner: 2013, 2014, 2015: 3
Republic of Ireland U-17
UEFA Women's Under-17 Championship
Runner Up: 2010

References

External links

Megan Campbell at FAI
Megan Campbell at Manchester City FC

1993 births
Living people
Republic of Ireland women's association footballers
Republic of Ireland women's international footballers
St Francis L.F.C. players
Raheny United F.C. players
Florida State Seminoles women's soccer players
Women's National League (Ireland) players
Florida State University alumni
Expatriate women's soccer players in the United States
Association footballers from County Louth
Women's Super League players
Manchester City W.F.C. players
Women's association football fullbacks
Liverpool F.C. Women players
Women's Championship (England) players
People from Drogheda
Republic of Ireland women's youth international footballers